Lydia White is an English linguist and educator.

Lydia White may also refer to:

Lydia Lucy White, English singer
Lydia Rogers White (died 1827), literary hostess in London
Lydia White (beauty pageant contestant), Miss American Beauty 1963

See also
Lydia White Shattuck (1822–1889), American botanist